Lemnos is a locality in the Goulburn Valley region of Victoria, Australia, on the outskirts of the regional city of Shepparton. At the 2006 census, Lemnos had a population of 369, which had dropped to 246 at the 2016 census.

The locality was established in 1927 as a soldier settlement area after the First World War. It was named by Ernest Hill, a returned soldier and soldier settler, after the Greek island of Lemnos, which was an operational base for the Gallipoli campaign and to which wounded Australian soldiers were evacuated.

Lemnos has a state school, general store with a post office agency, and a large farming community. Lemnos is also home to a Campbell Soup Company factory. In 2020, Lemnos was the site of Australia's only surgical mask factory, operated by Med-Con Pty Ltd.

References

Towns in Victoria (Australia)
City of Greater Shepparton
Australian soldier settlements
1927 establishments in Australia